St. Wendel is the name of a Catholic parish and church in Frankfurt-Sachsenhausen, Hesse, Germany, dedicated to Wendelin of Trier. The official name of the church is Kath. St. Wendelskirche. It was built from 1955 to 1957, designed by architect Johannes Krahn.

History 
Sachsenhausen had from 1369 a chapel dedicated to Wendelin of Trier, the patron saint of shepherds. In 1938, the architect Martin Weber built a provisionary church for the parish. It survived the war with little damage. The building of the present church began in 1955, and was completed in 1957. From 1962 to 1995, Lothar Zenetti was the parish priest. Since 2014, the parish St. Wendel is part of the larger .

Architecture 
Johannes Krahn, who built several churches and early skyscrapers such as the Beehive House in Frankfurt am Main, designed a space recalling elements of an early Romanesque Basilica. In a simple shape, a single long nave is concluded by a semicircle choir around the altar. The outer walls are sandstone, visible both inside and outside. Light flows in from bands of windows. The combination of materials has been compared to Le Corbusier. The building recalls the austere style of sacred architecture of the 1950s.

The bronze crucifix on the altar was made by Hans Mettel. Golden features were created by Fritz Schwerdt and Friedrich Gebhart. The organ, on a balcony above the main entrance, was built by Förster & Nicolaus Orgelbau in 1966, with 31 stops.

References

Literature 
 Karin Berkemann: Nachkriegskirchen in Frankfurt am Main (1945-76) (Denkmaltopographie Bundesrepublik Deutschland; Kulturdenkmäler in Hessen), Theiss-Verlag, Stuttgart 2013 [dissertation, Neuendettelsau, 2012]
 Deutscher Werkbund Hessen, Wilhelm E. Opatz (ed.): Einst gelobt und fast vergessen, moderne Kirchen in Frankfurt a. M. 1948–1973, Niggli-Verlag, Sulgen 2012, 
 Clemens Jöckle: 100 Bauwerke in Frankfurt am Main, Ein Wegweiser zu Bauwerken von historischem und baukünstlerischem Rang, Verlag Schnell & Steiner, Regensburg 1988, 
 Hugo Schnell: Der Kirchenbau des 20. Jahrhunderts in Deutschland, Regensburg 1973

External links 
 
 

Roman Catholic churches completed in 1957
Roman Catholic churches in Hesse
Churches in the Diocese of Limburg
Churches in Frankfurt
20th-century Roman Catholic church buildings in Germany